By-elections in New Zealand occur to fill vacant seats in the House of Representatives. The death, resignation, or expulsion of a sitting electorate MP can cause a by-election. (Note that list MPs do not have geographic districts for the purpose of provoking by-elections – if a list MP's seat becomes vacant, the next person on his or her party's list fills the position.) Historically, by-elections were often caused by general elections being declared void.

Background
Under the Electoral Act 1993, a by-election need not take place if a general election will occur within six months of an electorate seat becoming vacant, although confirmation by a resolution supported by at least 75% of MPs is required. In 1996 the general election date was brought forward slightly, to 12 October, to avoid a by-election after the resignation of Michael Laws. Twice, in 1943 and 1969, by-elections were avoided after the deaths in election years of Paraire Karaka Paikea and Ralph Hanan by passing special acts, the  By-election Postponement Act 1943 and the By-election Postponement Act 1969.

In recent years by-elections have not occurred particularly frequently – only one in the 2002–2005 parliamentary term, and none in the 1999–2002 or 2005–2008 terms. This is because most MPs who retire mid-term (e.g. Labour MPs Jim Sutton and Michael Cullen) were List MPs, so are simply replaced by the next member below them on their party list (unless that person is already an electorate MP, or does not agree). Some MPs have entered Parliament when two or more people above them on the list have declined, sometimes after pressure from their party: in 2008 Dail Jones (New Zealand First) and Russel Norman (Green); and in 2011 Louisa Wall (Labour) after five above her on the list declined.

Historically, however, they have taken place considerably more frequently – the 2nd Parliament of 1856–1860, for example, saw 33 by-elections and four supplementary elections, despite the House of Representatives originally having just 37 seats (increasing to 41 seats during the parliamentary term).

In the past it was not uncommon for an MP who died in office to be replaced with an immediate family member such as a brother, wife (see widow's succession), or son. This resulted in the election of the first woman MP Elizabeth McCombs (who was in turn succeeded by her son Terry McCombs), the first woman National MP Mary Grigg, and the first woman Māori MP Iriaka Rātana; all of whom took over their husband's seat. This practice has however fallen out of favour since the mid-seventies with the election of John Kirk to his late father's seat being the last occasion this happened at a by-election.

Mary Grigg was elected unopposed, and Wood notes that the 1942 Mid-Canterbury by-election is an extreme case where the election was gazetted without date of election, and four different dates are available from reputable sources: Official Year-book, Parliamentary Record, Journals of the House and J Boston.

Twelve Prime Ministers first came to parliament via by-elections: Julius Vogel, Harry Atkinson, Robert Stout, John Ballance, William Hall-Jones, William Massey, Peter Fraser, Keith Holyoake, Walter Nash, Bill Rowling, David Lange and Geoffrey Palmer. Six Prime Ministers (William Fox, Henry Sewell, Edward Stafford, George Grey, Joseph Ward and Jacinda Ardern) have won by-elections later in their parliamentary careers, while Labour leaders Harry Holland and David Shearer were also first elected via a by-election.

Some minor party founders have also launched their parties by resigning from a major party and their seat, then contesting it for their new party. Party founders who have done this include Matiu Rata and Tariana Turia. Both resigned from Labour to form Māori parties. In 1980 Rata was unsuccessful in retaking his Northern Maori electorate for his newly formed Mana Motuhake party, but in 2004 Turia successfully reclaimed Te Tai Hauauru for the Māori Party. In addition, Winston Peters resigned from National and his parliamentary seat in 1993, retaking the seat as an independent and going on to form the New Zealand First party. In these circumstances, by-elections are seen as a legitimisation of the MP's rejection of his or her old party. In addition, they provide vital publicity and something of a mandate for the new party.

By-elections for the party in government in the two-party era due to a resignation were sometimes an opportunity for party supporters to abstain or to vote against the government if they disapprove of their party's policies, without endangering the government. Bruce Beetham entered parliament for Social Credit at the 1978 Rangitikei by-election, as did Gary Knapp in the 1980 East Coast Bays by-election. In the 1994 Selwyn by-election National retained the seat, but the Alliance candidate came second, perhaps held by votes from disaffected Labour voters for the Alliance candidate. The 1926 Eden by-election was won by Labour who became the official opposition, helped by a split over the Reform candidate selection.

Pre-party era

Liberal Party era
Key

Multi-party era
Key

Two-party era (1938–1996)
Key

MMP era (1996–present)
Key

{| class="wikitable"
|- align=center
!  colspan=2 | Electorate and by-election !!  Date !! colspan=2 width=120 | Incumbent !! Cause !! colspan=2 | Winner
|-
| bgcolor=#EEEEEE align=center  colspan=8|

45th Parliament (1997–1999)
|-

|-
| bgcolor=#EEEEEE align=center  colspan=8|

46th Parliament (2000–2002)
|-
|colspan=8 align=center |There were no by-elections during the term of the 46th Parliament.
|-
| bgcolor=#EEEEEE align=center  colspan=8|

47th Parliament (2003–2005)
|-

|-
| bgcolor=#EEEEEE align=center  colspan=8|

48th Parliament (2006–2008)
|-
|colspan=8 align=center |There were no by-elections during the term of the 48th Parliament.
|-
| bgcolor=#EEEEEE align=center  colspan=8|

49th Parliament (2009–2011)
|-

|-
| bgcolor=#EEEEEE align=center  colspan=8|

50th Parliament (2011–2014)
|-

|-
| bgcolor=#EEEEEE align=center  colspan=8|

51st Parliament (2014–2017)
|-

|-
| bgcolor=#EEEEEE align=center  colspan=8|

52nd Parliament (2017–2020)
|-

|-
| bgcolor=#EEEEEE align=center  colspan=8|

53rd Parliament (2020–present)
|-

See also
 Elections in New Zealand

References

Bibliography

External links 
 Electoral Act 1993 (sections 129–133 refer to by-elections]
 By-election Postponement Act 1943 (avoided a by-election after the death of Paraire Karaka Paikea)
 By-election Postponement Act 1969 (avoided a by-election after the death of Ralph Hanan)

 *
Lists of by-elections
By-elections
By-elections